Municipal elections were held in Ontario November 13, 2000.

Elected mayors
Ajax: Steve Parish
Barrie: Jim Perri
Brampton: Susan Fennell
Brantford: Chris Friel (details)
Burlington: Robert MacIsaac 
Cambridge: Doug Craig
Chatham-Kent: Bill Erickson 
Clarington: John Mutton
Greater Sudbury: Jim Gordon (details)
Guelph: Karen Farbridge (details)
Hamilton: Bob Wade (details)
Kawartha Lakes: Art Truax (details)
Kingston: Isabel Turner
Kitchener: Carl Zehr
London: Anne Marie DeCicco
Markham: Don Cousens
Mississauga: Hazel McCallion easily defeated a Rod Stewart impersonator with the same name.
Niagara Falls: Wayne Thomson
Norfolk County: Rita Kalmbach (details)
Oakville: Ann Mulvale
Oshawa: Nancy Diamond
Ottawa: Bob Chiarelli (details)
Peterborough: Sylvia Sutherland (details)
Pickering: Wayne Arthurs
Richmond Hill: William Bell
Sarnia: Mike Bradley
Sault Ste. Marie: John Rowswell 
St. Catharines: Tim Rigby (details)
Thunder Bay: Ken Boshcoff
Toronto: Mel Lastman (details)
Vaughan: Lorna Jackson (details)
Waterloo: Lynne Woolstencroft
Whitby: Marcel Brunelle
Windsor: Michael Hurst (details)

References

 
Municipal elections
Ontario municipal elections
Ontario municipal elections
Municipal elections in Ontario